Professor John R. Minarcik is an American pathologist, creator of the Global Online Medical School Pathology Course. He is the author of Shotgun histology and Histopathology. Minarcik is professor of pathology at the International American University, 
Visiting Clinical Professor of Pathology, American University of Antigua Medical School,
Professor of Pathology at the Destiny University School of Medicine
Visiting Professor of Pathology at the University of Medicine and Health Sciences, St. Kitts, and served as a Workshop Director at the ASCP World Congress XXVI, Las Vegas Nevada, October 20, 2011, Teach An Entire Global Pathology Course, Lecture and Lab, Online!

References

External links
Medicalschoolpathology.com
Streaming lectures archive

Living people
1947 births
American pathologists